The Kultus Minister of Denmark was a Danish minister office. The responsibilities of the minister was the church, culture and education. The word kultus comes from cultus, Latin for adoration from which the words culture and cult are derived.

In 1916, the office was split up into an Education Minister and a Church Minister. The new Church Minister had responsibility for culture, a task transferred to the Minister for Cultural Affairs in 1961.

List of Kultus Ministers
There may or may not have been Kultus Ministers before Denmark became a constitutional monarchy in 1848

Kultus ministers under Frederick VII (1848–1863)

Kultus ministers under Christian IX (1863–1906)

Kultus ministers under Frederik VIII (1906–1912)

Kultus ministers under Christian X (1912–1947)

References
50 Ministers of Education - From the Danish Ministry of Education.

 
Lists of government ministers of Denmark
Government ministerial offices of Denmark